is a town located in Chiba Prefecture, Japan. , the town had an estimated population of  11,040 in 4942 households and a population density of 400 persons per km².

Geography
Shirako is located in eastern Chiba Prefecture, about 30 kilometers from the prefectural capital at Chiba and within 60 to 70 kilometers from the center of Tokyo.  Facing the Pacific Ocean, it is included in the Kujūkuri Plain and has a gentle terrain. It has a portion the Kujūkuri Beach, and the Nabaki River runs through the center of the town.

Neighboring municipalities
Chiba Prefecture
Mobara
Chōsei
Ōamishirasato

Climate
Shirako has a humid subtropical climate (Köppen Cfa) characterized by warm summers and cool winters with light to no snowfall.  The average annual temperature in Shirako is 15.3 °C. The average annual rainfall is 1633 mm with September as the wettest month. The temperatures are highest on average in August, at around 26.0 °C, and lowest in January, at around 5.6 °C.

Demographics
Per Japanese census data, the population of Shirako has remained relatively steady over the past 100 years.

History
The area of present-day Shirako is part of ancient Kazusa Province had numerous fishing hamlets during the Edo period. It was incorporated into Chōsei District after the Meiji period cadastral reforms and the town of Shirakata was created on April 1, 1889 with the establishment of the modern municipalities system. It was raised to town status on February 11, 1940.  On February 11, 1955 Shirakata merged with the neighboring villages of Seki and Nabaki and was proclaimed the town of Shirako. This name was adopted from a local Shinto shrine, Shirako Jinja, which claims to have been founded in the Heian period.

Government
Shirako has a mayor-council form of government with a directly elected mayor and a unicameral town council of 15 members. Together with the city of Sakura, Shirako, collectively with the other municipalities of Chōsei District, contributes one member to the Chiba Prefectural Assembly. In terms of national politics, the town is part of Chiba 11th district of the lower house of the Diet of Japan.

Economy
The primary industry of Shirako has traditionally been commercial fishing, however, the tourist and resort industry now dominates the local economy.

Education
Shirako has three public elementary schools and one public middle school operated by the town government. The town does not have a public high school.

Transportation

Railway
Shirako does not have any passenger train service.

Highway
The town is not located on any national highway.
Kujukuri Toll Road

Local attractions
Shirako Jinja
 Shirako Onsen

References

External links

Official Website 

Towns in Chiba Prefecture
Populated coastal places in Japan
Shirako